Epitrix is a genus of flea beetles in the family Chrysomelidae. There are 162 described species in Epitrix, which occur in all continents except Australia and Antarctica. Many species of the genus are serious pests of potatoes and other plants in the Solanaceae family.

Species

 Epitrix abeillei (Bauduer, 1874)
 Epitrix aeneicollis Jacoby, 1891
 Epitrix aethiopica (Weise, 1910)
 Epitrix aethiopica aethiopica (Weise, 1910)
 Epitrix aethiopica major Bechyné, 1960
 Epitrix allardii (Wollaston, 1860)
 Epitrix aloisia Bechyné, 1956
 Epitrix anahoria Bechyné & Springlova de Bechyné, 1960
 Epitrix angelina Bechyné & Springlova de Bechyné, 1960
 Epitrix angostura Bechyné, 1959
 Epitrix apanecana Bechyné & Springlova de Bechyné, 1960
 Epitrix apicicornis Baly, 1876
 Epitrix argentinensis Bryant, 1940
 Epitrix atomaria Weise, 1929
 Epitrix atomarioides Bechyné, 1955
 Epitrix atripes Harold, 1875
 Epitrix atripes atripes Harold, 1875
 Epitrix atripes silvicola Bechyné & Springlova de Bechyné, 1960
 Epitrix atropae Foudras, 1860
 Epitrix auricoma Bechyné & Springlova de Bechyné, 1960
 Epitrix bamendaensis Scherer, 1959
 Epitrix beniensis Bechyné, 1959
 Epitrix biscuta Bechyné & Springlova de Bechyné, 1961
 Epitrix biscuta biscuta Bechyné & Springlova de Bechyné, 1961
 Epitrix biscuta diluta Bechyné, 1966
 Epitrix brevis Schwarz, 1878
 Epitrix carecuruensis Bechyné & Springlova de Bechyné, 1960
 Epitrix catharina Bechyné, 1955
 Epitrix caucasica (Heikertinger, 1950)
 Epitrix cochabamba Bechyné, 1955
 Epitrix convexa Jacoby, 1885
 Epitrix coroicensis Bechyné, 1955
 Epitrix cucumeris (Harris, 1851) (potato flea beetle)
 Epitrix dalaba Bechyné, 1955
 Epitrix darwini Bryant, 1942
 Epitrix deborah Bechyné, 1955
 Epitrix dieckmanni (Mohr, 1968)
 Epitrix dilaticornis Jacoby, 1885
 Epitrix domenica Bechyné & Springlova de Bechyné, 1961
 Epitrix domenica domenica Bechyné & Springlova de Bechyné, 1961
 Epitrix domenica melanopicea Bechyné, 1966
 Epitrix egleri Bechyné & Springlova de Bechyné, 1961
 Epitrix ermischi (Mohr, 1968)
 Epitrix fallada Bechyné, 1955
 Epitrix fasciata Blatchley, 1918 (banded epitrix)
 Epitrix flaveola Harold, 1875
 Epitrix flavotestacea Horn, 1894
 Epitrix forsteri Bechyné, 1959
 Epitrix fulvicornis Jacoby, 1889
 Epitrix fuscata (Jacquelin-Duval, 1857)
 Epitrix fuscula Crotch, 1873 (eggplant flea beetle)
 Epitrix halophila Bechyné & Springlová de Bechyné, 1978
 Epitrix harilana Bechyné, 1997
 Epitrix harilana harilana Bechyné, 1997
 Epitrix harilana rubia Bechyné, 1997
 Epitrix haroldi Jacoby, 1885
 Epitrix hepperi Bryant, 1951
 Epitrix hirtipennis (F. E. Melsheimer, 1847) (tobacco flea beetle)
 Epitrix hirtula Harold, 1875
 Epitrix humeralis Dury, 1906
 Epitrix impressa Laboissière, 1942
 Epitrix impressicollis Scherer, 1959
 Epitrix inflatipes Bechyné, 1955
 Epitrix integralis Bechyné & Springlová de Bechyné, 1960
 Epitrix integricollis Jacoby, 1897
 Epitrix intermedia Foudras, 1860
 Epitrix jacobyi Weise, 1929
 Epitrix jariensis Bechyné & Springlová de Bechyné, 1965
 Epitrix jokoensis Bechyné, 1955
 Epitrix krali Döberl, 2000
 Epitrix lacustris Bechyné & Springlová de Bechyné, 1960
 Epitrix laevifrons Weise, 1895
 Epitrix laticollis Scherer, 1960
 Epitrix limonensis Bechyné, 1997
 Epitrix linda Bechyné & Springlová de Bechyné, 1961
 Epitrix lobata Crotch, 1873
 Epitrix lomasa Maulik, 1926
 Epitrix lucidula Harold, 1875
 Epitrix manoria Bechyné & Springlová de Bechyné, 1961
 Epitrix mercuria Bechyné, 1955
 Epitrix metallica Jacoby, 1891
 Epitrix minuta Jacoby, 1885
 Epitrix miraflora Bechyné, 1955
 Epitrix mirifica Scherer, 1960
 Epitrix monochroma Bechyné, 1955
 Epitrix montana Jacoby, 1885
 Epitrix muehlei Döberl, 2000
 Epitrix murina Harold, 1875
 Epitrix nicolina Bechyné & Springlová de Bechyné, 1960
 Epitrix nicotianae Bryant, 1936
 Epitrix nigroaenea Harold, 1875
 Epitrix nigropicta Bryant, 1951
 Epitrix nitens Weise, 1929
 Epitrix ninfa Bechyné & Springlová de Bechyné, 1960
 Epitrix nonsulcata Laboissière, 1942
 Epitrix nucea Baly, 1876
 Epitrix nycteroptera Bechyné & Springlová de Bechyné, 1960
 Epitrix obliterata Jacoby, 1891
 Epitrix ocobamba Bechyné, 1955
 Epitrix ogloblini (Iablokov-Khnzorian, 1960)
 Epitrix opacicollis Harold, 1875
 Epitrix paludicola Champion, 1920
 Epitrix papa Orlova-Bienkowskaja, 2015
 Epitrix parioides Bechyné, 1955
 Epitrix pectoralis Weise, 1929
 Epitrix pellucida Weise, 1921
 Epitrix penta Bechyné & Springlová de Bechyné, 1965
 Epitrix perquinensis Bechyné & Springlova de Bechyné, 1960
 Epitrix pertinax Scherer, 1960
 Epitrix piceomarginata Jacoby, 1891
 Epitrix plaumanni Bechyné, 1955
 Epitrix polyphaga Bechyné, 1997
 Epitrix priesneri (Heikertinger, 1950)
 Epitrix puberula (Boheman, 1859)
 Epitrix pubescens (Koch, 1803)
 Epitrix pubipennis Bryant, 1930
 Epitrix pulchella Jacoby, 1885
 Epitrix pulla Harold, 1875
 Epitrix puncticollis Jacoby, 1885
 Epitrix pygmaea Harold, 1875
 Epitrix quadriplagiata Bryant, 1951
 Epitrix ranquela Bechyné, 1955
 Epitrix ranquela ranquela Bechyné, 1955
 Epitrix ranquela gynandra Bechyné, 1959
 Epitrix ranquela insuavis Bechyné, 1997
 Epitrix ranquela aliena Bechyné & Springlová de Bechyné, 1961
 Epitrix riobrancoensis Scherer, 1960
 Epitrix robusta Jacoby, 1891
 Epitrix ruderalis Bechyné & Springlová de Bechyné, 1978
 Epitrix rufula Weise, 1929
 Epitrix rugipleura Bechyné & Springlová de Bechyné, 1978
 Epitrix salomona Bechyné, 1955
 Epitrix scenica Bechyné, 1955
 Epitrix sejuncta Baly, 1876
 Epitrix sensitiva Bechyné & Springlová de Bechyné, 1978
 Epitrix serratula Baly, 1876
 Epitrix setosella (Fairmaire, 1888)
 Epitrix similaris Gentner, 1944
 Epitrix simplex Weise, 1921
 Epitrix solani (Blatchley, 1925)
 Epitrix spyria Bechyné, 1955
 Epitrix suavis Bechyné, 1955
 Epitrix subcostata Jacoby, 1885
 Epitrix subcrinita (J. L. LeConte, 1857) (western potato flea beetle)
 Epitrix subfusca Jacoby, 1897
 Epitrix subglabrata Jacoby, 1885
 Epitrix subtilis Harold, 1875
 Epitrix subvestita Baly, 1876
 Epitrix subviolacea Bechyné & Springlová de Bechyné, 1978
 Epitrix sylvicola Bryant, 1953
 Epitrix tantula Harold, 1875
 Epitrix thoracica Jacoby, 1885
 Epitrix thoracolysa Bechyné & Springlová de Bechyné, 1960
 Epitrix tincticollis Weise, 1929
 Epitrix torrida Baly, 1876
 Epitrix torvi Bryant, 1936
 Epitrix tovarensis Bechyné, 1997
 Epitrix tovarensis tovarensis Bechyné, 1997
 Epitrix tovarensis meridensis Bechyné, 1997
 Epitrix trapezophora Bechyné & Springlová de Bechyné, 1978
 Epitrix triangularis Bechyné & Springlová de Bechyné, 1960
 Epitrix trichogramma Bechyné, 1997
 Epitrix tuberis Gentner, 1944 (tuber flea beetle)
 Epitrix tucumanensis Bechyné, 1955
 Epitrix ubaquensis Harold, 1875
 Epitrix ubaquensis ubaquensis Harold, 1875
 Epitrix ubaquensis venezuelensis Jacoby, 1889
 Epitrix uruguayica Bryant, 1942
 Epitrix vestita (Boheman, 1859)
 Epitrix victoria Bechyné, 1955
 Epitrix villosa Harold, 1876
 Epitrix vincentina Bechyné & Springlová de Bechyné, 1960
 Epitrix violacea Jacoby, 1885
 Epitrix virgulata Harold, 1875
 Epitrix warchalowskii (Mohr, 1968)
 Epitrix weisei Jacoby, 1897
 Epitrix weyrauchi Bechyné, 1959
 Epitrix wittmeri Bechyné, 1955
 Epitrix yanazara Bechyné, 1959
 Epitrix yungarum Bechyné, 1955

References

 Riley, Edward G., Shawn M. Clark, and Terry N. Seeno (2003). "Catalog of the leaf beetles of America north of Mexico (Coleoptera: Megalopodidae, Orsodacnidae and Chrysomelidae, excluding Bruchinae)". Coleopterists Society Special Publication no. 1, 290.

Further reading

 Arnett, R.H. Jr., M. C. Thomas, P. E. Skelley and J. H. Frank. (eds.). (2002). American Beetles, Volume II: Polyphaga: Scarabaeoidea through Curculionoidea. CRC Press LLC, Boca Raton, FL.
 Arnett, Ross H. (2000). American Insects: A Handbook of the Insects of America North of Mexico. CRC Press.
 Richard E. White. (1983). Peterson Field Guides: Beetles. Houghton Mifflin Company.

Alticini
Chrysomelidae genera